Dromica thomaswiesneri is a tiger beetle, described by Wiesner in 2001. It is currently only known from Eswatini (Swaziland).

References

thomaswiesneri
Endemic fauna of Eswatini
Beetles described in 2001